{{Taxobox
| name = Murexsul aradasii
| image = Murexsul aradasii (MNHN-IM-2000-124) 001.jpeg
| image_caption = Shell of Murexsul aradasii (syntype at MNHN, Paris)
| regnum = Animalia
| phylum = Mollusca
| classis = Gastropoda
| unranked_superfamilia = clade Caenogastropodaclade Hypsogastropodaclade Neogastropoda
| superfamilia = Muricoidea
| familia = Muricidae
| subfamilia = Muricopsinae
| genus = Murexsul
| subgenus =
| species = M. aradasii
| binomial = Murexsul aradasii
| binomial_authority = (Monterosato in Poirier, 1883)
| synonyms_ref = 
| synonyms =
  Murex aradasii Monterosato in Poirier, 1883
 Murex cyclopus Benoit in Monterosato, 1884
 Murex diadema Aradas & Benoit, 1876
 Murex labiosus var. fasciata Coen, 1933 
 Murex medicago Watson, 1897
 Murex spinulosus Costa, 1861 (not Deshayes, 1835)
 Muricidea spinulosa (Costa O.G., 1861)
 Muricidea spinulosa var. scalata <small>Monterosato, 1884</small
 Muricopsis aradasii (Poirier, 1883)
 Muricopsis diadema (Aradas & Benoit, 1876)
 Muricopsis diadema var. elongatus Settepassi, 1977
 Muricopsis diadema var. horridaus' Settepassi, 1977
 Muricopsis diadema var. muticus Monterosato in Settepassi, 1977
 Muricopsis diadema var. robustus Settepassi, 1977
 Muricopsis medicago (Watson, 1897)
 Muricopsis spinulosa (Costa O.G., 1861)
}}Murexsul aradasii is a species of sea snail, a marine gastropod mollusk in the family Muricidae, the murex snails or rock snails.

Description
The shell size varies between 7 mm and 18 mm

Distribution
This species is distributed in European waters along Madeira and the Canary Islands and in the Mediterranean Sea along Greece.

References

 Coen G. (1933). Saggio di una Sylloge Molluscorum Adriaticorum. Memorie del Regio Comitato Talassografico Italiano 192: pp. i-vii, 1-186
 Gofas, S.; Le Renard, J.; Bouchet, P. (2001). Mollusca, in: Costello, M.J. et al. (Ed.) (2001). European register of marine species: a check-list of the marine species in Europe and a bibliography of guides to their identification''. Collection Patrimoines Naturels, 50: pp. 180–213

External links
 Poirier, J. (1883). Révision des Murex du Muséum. Nouvelles Archives du Muséum d'Histoire Naturelle [Paris. (2) 5: 13-128]
 Aradas A. & Benoit L. (1872-1876 ("1870") ). Conchigliologia vivente marina della Sicilia e delle isole che la circondano. Atti dell'Accademia Gioenia di Scienze Naturali. ser. 3, 6
 Watson, R. B. (1897). On the marine Mollusca of Madeira; with descriptions of thirty-five new species, and an index-list of all the known sea-dwelling species of that island. Journal of the Linnean Society of London, Zoology. 26(19): 233-329, pl. 19-20
 Costa, O. G. (1861). Microdoride mediterranea; o, Descrizione de poco ben conosciuti od affatto ignoti viventi minuti e micoscropici del Meditterraneo, pel professore O. G. Costa. Tomo primo. Con tredici tavole. i-xviii, 1-80. Stamperia dell'Iride, Napoli.
 Monterosato, T. A. di. (1884). Nomenclatura generica e specifica di alcune conchiglie mediterranee. Virzi, printed for the Author, Palermo, 152 pp
 

Muricidae
Gastropods described in 1883